"True Blue" is the fourth single by Japanese rock band Luna Sea, released on September 21, 1994. It was the band's first number 1 on the Oricon Singles Chart, and charted for 17 weeks. In 2000, it was certified Platinum by the RIAJ for sales over 400,000. The song was covered by melodic death metal band Blood Stain Child for their 2005 album Idolator.

Track listing
All songs written and composed by Luna Sea.

"True Blue" - 3:55Originally composed by J.
"Fallout" - 6:58Originally composed by J. The title refers to "nuclear fallout".

References

Luna Sea songs
Oricon Weekly number-one singles
1994 singles
1994 songs